Gregg Heschong is an American cinematographer and television director.

For much of his career, he amassed a number cinematography credits in the television series The Tracey Ullman Show, Perfect Strangers, The George Carlin Show, Wanda at Large, 'Til Death, Twins, Better with You, $#*! My Dad Says and Fuller House. As well as working as a cinematographer and director for the series Family Matters, NewsRadio, Becker and True Jackson, VP.

Prior to a career in television, Heschong has also had a career in feature films working as a camera operator and director of photography on the films Firefox (1982), Tron (1982), Broadcast News (1987) and Who Framed Roger Rabbit (1988).

In 2006, Heschong received a Primetime Emmy nomination for his cinematography work on The New Adventures of Old Christine,

References

External links

American cinematographers
American television directors
Living people
Place of birth missing (living people)
Year of birth missing (living people)